Route 435 is a  north–south highway on the Great Northern Peninsula of Newfoundland in the Canadian province of Newfoundland and Labrador. It connects the communities on the northwestern tip of the peninsula (Cape Norman) with Route 430 (Viking Trail/Great Northern Peninsula Highway) and St. Anthony.

Route description

Route 435 begins at an intersection with Route 430 several kilometres northwest of St. Anthony and the road winds its way northwest along the coastline for several kilometres, where it passes by an abandoned airport and has an intersection with a local road leading to Big Brook and Eddies Cove. The highway continues northward to Cook's Harbour, where it makes a sharp left turn at an intersection with Main Street. Route 435 now winds its way west, passing through Wild Bight and having an intersection with a local road leading to the community of Cape Norman and the Cape Norman Lighthouse. It now turns to the south for a few kilometres to travel along the beach before arriving at North Boat Harbour, where Route 435 comes to a dead end.

Major intersections

References

435